Finland participated at the 2010 Winter Olympics in Vancouver, British Columbia, Canada.

Medalists

Review 
The Finnish Olympic Committee had set a goal of 12 medals for the 2010 Winter Olympics, and considered the result of 5 medals far weaker than expected. By discipline, it summarized in its annual report: "The most positive results were achieved in ice hockey, snowboarding and figure skating, whereas the performances in cross-country skiing, ski jumping, Nordic combined and biathlon were clearly below the expected."

The central conclusions drawn by the Olympic committee on coaching issues on which to take action towards 2014 were:
 The role and leadership of head coaches were weak.
 The competence of the coaching of national sports federations was inadequate.
 The ratio of decentralized and centralized exercise was distorted.
 Know-how in mental training was weak.
 The emphasis of ski maintenance has elevated in winter sports.

Alpine skiing

Biathlon

Cross-country skiing 

Distance

Men

Women

Sprint

Figure skating 

Finland has qualified one entrant in men's singles and two in ladies singles, for a total of three athletes.

Freestyle skiing 

Ski cross

Ice hockey

Men's tournament 

Roster

Group play 
Finland played in Group C.
Round-robin
All times are local (UTC-8).

Standings

Final rounds 
Quarterfinal

Semifinal

Bronze medal game

Women's tournament 

Roster

Group play 
Finland played in Group B.

Round-robin
All times are local (UTC-8).

Final rounds 
Semifinal

Bronze medal game

Nordic combined

Ski jumping 

Note: PQ indicates a skier was pre-qualified for the final, based on entry rankings.

Snowboarding 

Halfpipe

Parallel GS

Speed skating

See also

 Finland at the 2010 Winter Paralympics

References 

2010 in Finnish sport
Nations at the 2010 Winter Olympics
2010